Liu Yuan-kai (born 2 December 1981) is a Taiwanese athlete who specialises in the sprinting events. He represented his country at the 2011 and 2013 World Championships as well as four consecutive Asian Games.

Competition record

Personal bests
Outdoor
100 metres – 10.29 (+0.9 m/s, Yunlin 2006)
200 metres – 20.84 (+0.5 m/s, Tainan 2007)
400 metres – 47.31 (Kaohsiung 1999)
Indoor
60 metres – 6.90 (Tehran 2004)

References

1981 births
Living people
Taiwanese male sprinters
Athletes (track and field) at the 2002 Asian Games
Athletes (track and field) at the 2006 Asian Games
Athletes (track and field) at the 2010 Asian Games
Athletes (track and field) at the 2014 Asian Games
World Athletics Championships athletes for Chinese Taipei
Asian Games medalists in athletics (track and field)
Asian Games silver medalists for Chinese Taipei
Medalists at the 2010 Asian Games
Competitors at the 2003 Summer Universiade
Competitors at the 2005 Summer Universiade
Competitors at the 2007 Summer Universiade